Morten Andreas Strøksnes (born 30 November 1965) is a Norwegian journalist and non-fiction writer.

Personal life
Strøksnes was born in Kirkenes on 30 November 1965.

Career
His books include Hellig grunn from 2001, Snøen som falt i fjor from 2004, Automobil – Gjennom Europas Bakgård from 2005, Et mord i Kongo from 2010, about Tjostolv Moland and Joshua French, and Tequiladagbøkene – Gjennom Sierra Madre from 2012.

For his 2015 book Havboka he was awarded both the Brage Prize and the Norwegian Critics Prize for Literature. As of 2018 the book has been sold to 24 countries, and the English translation (titled Shark Drunk) was awarded the British Wanderlust Adventure Travel Book of the Year in 2018.

Bibliography 
 Hellig grunn (2001)
 Snøen som falt i fjor (2004)
 Automobil – Gjennom Europas Bakgård (2005)
 Et mord i Kongo (2010)
 Tequiladagbøkene – Gjennom Sierra Madre (2012)
 Havboka (2015)

References

1965 births
Living people
People from Sør-Varanger
Norwegian journalists
Norwegian non-fiction writers